The asphalt industry in Trinidad is located at the Pitch Lake at the town of La Brea in southwestern Trinidad, Trinidad and Tobago and it has gained a reputation for itself as the world's largest deposit. The Pitch Lake is considered a tourist attraction and attracts about 20,000 visitors annually. It is also mined for asphalt by Lake Asphalt of Trinidad and Tobago.

Origin and deposits
Asphalt, according to Sir Walter Raleigh speaking on March 22, 1595, the Pitch Lake will be beneficial to our growing economy. The asphalt industry is the second most important mining activity after petroleum. The industry is a government-owned state enterprise. This natural deposit of asphalt or pitch is of volcanic origin. The lake covers about 46 ha and is reported to be 76 m deep with a maximum of 87 m in the center. Deposits are estimated to be 6.1 million tonnes. The deposits occur in a syncline less than one km from the sea.this asphalt is used for roads fixing ships etc.

Composition and structure
Asphalt is found in lakes or in seeps where oxidization of petroleum takes place. It is black or brown in color due to its hydro-carbon composition and comprises nitrogen, sulphur and oxygen. It is made up of an emulsion of mineral elements and bitumen.

Uses
Asphalt has practical advantages in that it is elastic and can be used in several ways:

Use as an anti-corrosive agent for underwater natural gas pipelines and for engineering works as the lining of reservoirs and in fittings.
Use in chemical and oil resistant flooring and as insulating compounds for electrical cable and electrical industries.
Use as a binder or adhesive in road construction and paving of airports; waterproofing floorings; making battery casings, brake linings and metal coatings.

Mining
Asphalt is dug manually and mechanically by tractors. After it is excavated, asphalt comes up slowly to the surface. Mining operations begun since 1815 and continuous exploration has led to the surface level dropping by 9.1 m. It is decreasing at a rate of 155 mm per annum. The asphalt is taken by trucks to railway cars which are on the incline. They are pulled by cables up to a trestle to be treated into dried asphalt and asphalt cement for export.

Refining and transport to port
The asphalt is dumped into one of six stills and boiled or heated for 24 hours to produce the dried asphalt for export. In this way, water and gas are removed. This leaves it free from moisture, which accounts for 30% of the weight. Asphalt cement is made by adding bituminous oil.

Containers are loaded at filling sites. A tramway or aerial cableway takes the products to the pier at Brighton for export. The entire operation is streamlined.

Exports
Trinidad has long been an exporter of refined asphalt or epure. Australia is one country which imports asphalt from Trinidad while there are countries on the continents of Africa,  South America and Europe that import as well. Exports, however, have declined considerably in recent years due to a factor of the increasing use  of refinery bitumen in road making all over the world.

Employment
The industry provides jobs for about 600 workers. There are those who are engaged in the mining and processing operations and those engaged in clerical services as typists, accountants and payroll clerks. Some  of the workers include tractor and overload operators, rakers, trestlemen, still men, container staffers and shipping workers.

Notes

Ore deposits
Economy of Trinidad and Tobago